Trina Saha (born 21 January 1993) is an Indian television actress. Saha started her career in television as a lead actress through Khokababu (TV series) portraying the character Tori. She has acted in many Bengali movies and TV soap operas. She has performed in many music videos like Chaina composed and sung by Shaan.

Television

Filmography

Web series

Awards

References

External links 
 

Bengali actresses
21st-century Indian actors
Living people
1993 births
Bengali television actresses
Actresses in Bengali television
Shri Shikshayatan College alumni